The 1875 Yale Bulldogs football team represented Yale University in the 1875 college football season. The Bulldogs finished with a 2–2 record. The team won games against Rutgers and Wesleyan and lost to Harvard and Columbia.

Schedule

Standings

References

Yale
Yale Bulldogs football seasons
Yale Bulldogs football